Star Wars Galaxies was a Star Wars- themed massively multiplayer online role-playing game (MMORPG) for Microsoft Windows, developed by Sony Online Entertainment and published by LucasArts.

Released on June 26, 2003, to much critical acclaim, it spawned three expansions through 2005. The game was completely overhauled in the last expansion, which frustrated many longtime subscribers. Star Wars Galaxies continued operation for six more years.

The servers shut down on December 15, 2011, just 5 days prior to the release of Star Wars: The Old Republic. Notwithstanding the game's closure, there are several private emulator projects in various stages of development that intend to allow users to experience Star Wars Galaxies in different incarnations of the game's existence.

Gameplay

The ten species that were available to players included: Human, Twi'lek, Zabrak, Wookiee, Trandoshan, Rodian, Mon Calamari, Bothan, Sullustan and Ithorian.

There were nine professions in the game after the New Game Enhancements(NGE) (34 pre-NGE): Jedi, Bounty Hunter, Smuggler, Commando, Spy, Officer, Medic, Entertainer, and Trader. The trader was further divided into four separate professions: Domestic Goods (tailoring and cooking), Engineering (droid and vehicle crafting), Structures (shipwright and architect), and Munitions (weapons and armor crafting). Progress in these professions was divided into three separate experience source groups: combat, crafting, and entertaining. In addition to these professions, a character could also pursue three optional (they could be advanced in regardless of chosen main profession or progress in it): Pilot, Chronicler, and Politician. During the Pre-NGE, customization was easier due to "skill points" which could be spread amongst many different profession trees.

Pilot sub-profession allowed users to load out and use spaceships specific to three different career paths represented GCW alignment (Imperial, Neutral, and Rebel). Advancement in the profession was based on obtaining experience via space combat and completion of missions assigned by chosen wing command (three different available for each faction). Pilots may also enter atmospheric flight mode and engage in combat attacking targets on the planet's surface (i.e. opposing faction PvP-flagged players).
Chronicler sub-profession allowed building holocrons with player-created quests: placed props (temporarily existing in-game world items and NPCs), objectives, and narration. Advancement in the profession is based on obtaining experience via constructing holocrons and having other players complete and rate such creations.
The politician profession allowed users to create and manage a player city. Acquired and completed automatically when a player places a structure belonging to him.

Characters could specialize in three different areas of their main professions by selecting "expertise" options, including Beast Mastery (BM). The Trader professions shared not only BM expertise but also general expertise (which includes specializing in resource sampling and mining via player-placed structures - harvesters, reverse engineering, manufacturing via player-placed structures - factories and vendors maintenance), third expertise consists of two given trader type specific areas of crafting specialization. All professions were combat capable although with a definite bias towards combat professions prowess, followed by entertainers (HtH combat based on Drama expertise and/or BM expertise) and traders (combat based solely on pet crafted droids or BM expertise). Although some of the combat professions are more prone to fall into generic roles of tank/DPS/support all of them can specialize via expertise and correctly built items configuration (armor/clothing and weaponry is entirely player created and developed; its quality, enhancements, and efficiency based on crafter's equipment and quality and proper composition of resources; drop and quest reward items are sub-par). This system allows the combat to be more balanced between different professions while retaining a variety of playstyles. The only generic role reserved for a single profession is healer, as only Medic can heal another character. However, all combat professions have sustainable self-healing options.

The Jump to Lightspeed expansion made individual ships attainable by players for the first time. This allowed players to acquire and pilot ships of various sizes. Ships ranged in size from small one-man fighter craft to larger gunships with up to three decks. Some players choose to play most of the game in space, while others play in both space and planetary settings. The TCG has added in a few other ships, as well as certain updates.

With the NGE, ground combat was changed to real-time and similar to a first-person shooter. The player must aim a targeting reticule at a target and left-click the mouse to fire. Auto-aim and auto-fire features are available, creating a more traditional combat experience, but players eschewing those options are rewarded with an increased chance to do maximum damage. As characters gain levels, they gain access to additional combat abilities called "specials" which are activated by using the right mouse button or by clicking the ability on a toolbar. These specials usually have a cool-down period. In addition to providing especially powerful damage attacks, specials are also used to heal, buff, debuff, and crowd control. Players gain the ability to use more powerful weapons as they advance in level. Players also earn "Expertise Points" as they level up which they can use in their professional expertise "tree". The player can allot 45 points to various abilities and attributes to make their characters more diverse, from weapons specialties to healing and armor proficiency. Once a character reaches the max level 90 they would be able to do "Heroic" missions with a group of up to 8 other players. Before you could enter a Heroic mission the character has to complete a pre-quest that would unlock the quest and give permission to enter the instance. To acquire the mission you had to speak to a certain NPC to start the quest and after completing granted access. The five heroic missions were: Tusken Invasion, IG88, Axkva Min, Imperial Star Destroyer, and Exar Kun. After completing these heroics you were granted one token from that instance and would have to wait another 24 hours before re-entering for more tokens. Tokens collected would get you a 5 piece of jewelry set that granted advantages for that profession.

Characters can erect, own and decorate a variety of buildings, including houses, cantinas, theaters, hospitals, guild halls, and city halls. These buildings, when grouped, can be organized into cities. Players hold elections via ballot box for Mayor. Elected mayors grant city members certain rights to place structures within the city and disallow the use of various civic structures by individual players as needed. Elections are held every three weeks. If another player wishes to run for mayor they can add their name at any time to the ballot box to run against the incumbent. As cities grow in population, they become eligible to add services and facilities such as vehicle repair garages, shuttle ports, cloning facilities, hospitals, cantinas, and garden displays. They can show up on the planet maps alongside canonical cities such as Theed and Mos Eisley.

The gameplay design encouraged realistic social institutions such as a dynamic player economy and other real-life social phenomena like a complicated division of labor. According to Star Wars Galaxies and the Division of Labor, the division of labor in Star Wars Galaxies around April 2005 produced in-game results similar to those in real life. Galaxies original game design socialized players to specialize their characters by mastering one or two professions, and to join guilds, in which players relate to one another primarily in terms of their professions.

Other features
 Single- and multi-passenger ground vehicles and starships (podracers, landspeeders, speeder bikes, swoops, X-wings, TIE fighters and YT series ships).
 Player-run virtual economy where player characters are responsible for creating many in-game items including blasters, starships, clothing, armor, food, housing, furniture and even a wide variety of droids. Items are created from player-collected raw materials and looted items.
 An extensive set of emotes, moods, and associated animations, which affect not only an avatar's physical appearance but also the text used to describe a character's speech, and even the shape of the speech bubble displayed on-screen.
 The ability for players to place bounties on opponents that participate in PvP. Player character bounty hunters can then pick up another character's "bounty mission" on the terminals and track the character down. A bounty can be claimed at any time, regardless of the target's PvP setting. Up to three bounty hunters can be tracking a character at any given time.
 Dynamic resource spawns on planets needed for complex crafting. Each having unique name and random quality of appropriate resource statistics. Resources are divided into complex tree of origins and properties. All player made items require specific resources listed in schematic. Statistics of gathered and used resources determine item's parameters.
 An extensive character creation system. Characters can hire Entertainers to change their appearance in-game, with even more options than those available at creation. Many visual aspects of a character are thereby changeable at any time after character creation except species and gender.
 The game references and features elements from Star Wars Holiday Special, such as Lumpy's stuffed bantha, and the customs of Life Day, when the player visits Kashyyyk. The red Life Day robes that the Wookiees wore are also available during special events in the game.
 Large player run environments with complex ranking systems tailored towards each Player Association (PA). These organizations were run by player leaders and had the ability to make social alliances, and trade deals. PA's developed with complexity as players role played through the maturity of the game.

Setting
The game events were originally set following the destruction of the Death Star in Episode IV: A New Hope, but before the beginning of The Empire Strikes Back. Even though the battle of Hoth has been included this does not change the timeline. Some parts of the game include past "missions" to before the destruction of the Death Star.

The game launched with 10 planets: Tatooine, Naboo, Corellia, Talus, Rori, Dantooine, Lok, Yavin 4, the forest moon of Endor, and Dathomir. In the second expansion, Rage of the Wookiees, the Wookiee home planet Kashyyyk was added. In the third expansion, Trials of Obi-Wan, the planet Mustafar was added. Each of the original 10 planets are represented by approximately 225 square kilometers (15 km x 15 km maps) of game space. In contrast, the expansion planets of Kashyyyk and Mustafar are smaller, constructed differently (e.g. instances) and in some cases imposed different rules than the original, such as terrain that is not traversable (i.e. mountains or hills that cannot be climbed over). In addition to the 12 planets, there are 12 space zones, each encompassing approximately 3400 cubic kilometers (15 km cubes) of fully navigable space. Nine of them are associated with one or more of the playable planets: Tatoo (Tatooine), Naboo (Naboo and Rori), Corellia (Corellia and Talus), Dantooine, Karthakk (Lok), Yavin, Endor, Dathomir, and Kashyyyk. (Mustafar has no associated space zone.) Kessel and Deep Space have no planets and are used for high-level gameplay and player-versus-player combat. The Ord Mantell sector was released in January 2008 as a new space-only zone, though there is a space station there (called Nova Orion) where pilots can land and acquire quests. The planet Hoth was added in November 2008 as part of an instance, but could only be explored during the events of the Battle of Echo Base.

Examples of characters and points of interest that players could visit within the game include R2-D2, C-3PO, their escape pod on Tatooine, the Naboo Royal Palace, the abandoned Rebel bases on Dantooine and Yavin 4, the notorious pirate Nym in his stronghold on Lok, Ewoks and Rancors. Other main characters include Luke Skywalker, Han Solo, Princess Leia Organa, Darth Vader, Chewbacca, Emperor Palpatine, Admiral Ackbar, Jan Dodonna, Boba Fett, Jabba, Borvo the Hutt, Bib Fortuna, Salacious Crumb, General Otto, Captain Panaka (appears as Colonel Panaka), Max Rebo, Wedge Antilles, Gavyn Sykes, Watto, Boss Nass, Grand Inquisitor Ja'ce Yiaso, the "reincarnation" of General Grievous as NK-Necrosis, Taga Olak, Jefa Bowa and the Force ghost of Obi-Wan Kenobi.

References are also made of characters from the Star Wars expanded universe, such as Grand Admiral Thrawn. Mara Jade from the Thrawn trilogy could be found in the Deathwatch bunker, as well as in Theed on Naboo for Empire Day. HK-47 from the Knights of the Old Republic video games is the main boss involved in the Champion of Mustafar quest.

The game also references the other two Star Wars spin-off films, in that the player may encounter the Gorax species from Caravan of Courage: An Ewok Adventure, and the base of the Sanyassan Marauders, as seen in Ewoks: The Battle for Endor.

Production
The game was first announced in 2000, when LucasArts Entertainment began a partnership with EverQuest creators Verant Interactive Inc. and Sony Online Entertainment to create the first massively multiplayer Star Wars online role-playing game. The announcement included an expected release date of 2001 and that the game would take place during the original trilogy era.

On May 17, 2001, even before the game went into public beta testing, the first expansion's development was announced. The yet unnamed add-on, which was expected to be available six months after the initial product release, would be a space simulation and enable players to own and fly starships which would allow interplanetary travel and space combat. The release date of the initial product, the ground-based component, was updated to the second half of 2002. The staggered release schedule of the space component of the Star Wars Galaxies series was said to benefit players because they would have time to establish their characters and explore different elements of the core game before adding the space layer. Traveling between planets would be accomplished through the use of public shuttles, which would ferry characters from world to world. A new official site was also released on the same day that put more of an emphasis behind the community of the game. It included new screen shots, movies, an updated FAQ, concept art, development team member's profiles, features about the game, and a new forum. The site reached 100,001 users by December 2001. Throughout the next year after the release of the new site, new content would be revealed. This content included information on species and locations, new images and movies of different game elements, and 360 degree QuickTime VR panoramas of different locations.

The closed beta test began in July 2002. SOE would share more information on the game as the beta moved forward. This would include more screen shots, information on match making services, the fact that players would be permitted only one character per server, and skill trees, and how the skill-based system would function. LucasArts also said in 2002 that both the Xbox and PlayStation 2 would get a version of the game, however both versions were cancelled.

Release and continued development
The game was originally to be released on April 15, 2003. They also announced on December 20, 2002, that the ground-based component of Star Wars Galaxies would be called An Empire Divided and that the game's online community had grown to over 400,000 users since its inception in November 2000. At the time, this represented one of the largest ever fan communities amassed for any game prior to retail availability. An Empire Divided would later be delayed to June 26, 2003.

The base game, titled Star Wars Galaxies: An Empire Divided, was released on June 26, 2003, in the US and on November 7, 2003, in Europe. A localized version for the Japanese market was published by EA Japan on December 23, 2004. Japanese acceptance of the game was low, and in November 2005 the servers were shut down and existing accounts migrated to US servers.

At the time of its initial release, the game was very different from how it ended up. Vehicles and creature mounts were not yet implemented. While player housing was available at the time of launch, the ability to incorporate groups of houses into cities didn't come until November 2003. Each character and creature possessed three "pools" (called Health, Action, and Mind; or "HAM") that represented his or her physical and mental reserves. Most attacks specifically targeted one of these three pools and any action the character took also depleted one or more of the pools. When any one of those pools was fully depleted, the character would fall unconscious. Combat, then, required the player to carefully manage his or her actions to avoid depleting a pool.

Character progression was vastly different at release as well. Characters started out in one of six basic professions (Medic, Brawler, Marksman, Scout, Entertainer, or Artisan) and could pick up any of the other screenshotstime after character creation. Each profession consisted of a tree-like structure of skills, with a single Novice level, four independent branches of four levels each, and a Master level which required completion of all four branches. Characters purchased these skills with experience points gained through a related activity. For example, an Entertainer could purchase skills to get bet360-degreeying music, but only with Musician experience points. Dancing experience points were entirely separate and could only be used to purchase dancing skills.

In addition to the basic professions, characters could specialize into advanced professions such as Bounty Hunter, Creature Handler, Ranger, Doctor, and Musician. There were a total of 24  advanced professions, although there was no way for characters to obtain all of them at once. Each advanced profession had certain skill requirements from the base professions that had to be met, some more restrictive than others.

Jedi were not available as a starting profession, or even as an advanced profession. The developers stated only that certain in-game actions would open up a Force-sensitive character slot. The actions required were left for players to discover. It eventually turned out that characters had to achieve Master level in random professions. At first the player had to complete four master level classes which were randomly chosen and unknown to the player. The developers then introduced Holocrons which would inform the player of the first, then after completion second master class required. At various times the number of master levels needed ranged from four to seven and the number revealed by holocrons varied from two to four. Because of the difficulty in obtaining a force sensitive (Jedi) character, the profession had many advantages in combat, often capable of taking on very powerful enemies or defeating entire groups of other non-Jedi characters in Player vs. Player combat. The first Force-sensitive character slot was unlocked on November 7, 2003.

Server closures
On September 16, 2009, SOE informed all current and past account holders of the forthcoming closure of 12 servers (galaxies): Corbantis, Europe-Infinity, Intrepid, Kauri, Kettemoor, Lowca, Naritus, Scylla, Tarquinas, Tempest, Valcyn and Wanderhome. Character creation on these servers was disabled on September 15, 2009, with the final closure of the servers on October 15, 2009. Players with characters on the affected servers were offered free character transfer to one of the 13 remaining servers.

Hacking incident
On May 3, 2011, SOE issued a press release stating that all SOE had been isolated from the Internet, due to massive and widespread security infiltrations of various games, servers, databases. Security teams (and the FBI) were called in and at that time no information was available regarding when the services would be restored. Initial reports indicated personal data of 20-30 million customers had potentially been compromised, none within the USA. The information compromised was old information including addresses and CC information from 2007. All SOE webpages were re-directed temporarily to a customer announcement and a press release page. On May 14, 2011, SOE declared everything safe and reopened all servers. SOE offered a free 30-day membership for gamers with memberships and a 1:1 ratio of days lost. Once opened they gave every account 45 free days as well as a minor object of decoration as a "perk" for waiting out the cause.

On May 17, 2011, SOE released Hotfix 19.17 which introduced the new feature of bounty-hunting in space. This allowed players to place a bounty on players of the opposite faction who had recently destroyed their ship in space combat. This allowed bounty hunters to pick these targets up as missions and pursue them in space for the monetary reward (up to 1 million credits) the player had placed on the target.

Closure
On June 24, 2011, SOE and LucasArts announced that they had mutually agreed to shut down Star Wars Galaxies on December 15, 2011. According to the SOE announcement, both LucasArts and SOE came to the agreement that "If you are an active subscriber in good standing as of September 15, 2011, then you can play for free for the final months. Players wishing to play through the end of the game and participate in the galaxy-ending event planned for the last week of live service in December will need to re-activate or join the game on or before September 15. No new or reactivated accounts will be accepted after September 15, 2011."

On December 15, 2011, at 9:01 PM Pacific time, the servers of Star Wars Galaxies shut down, disconnecting those still playing and not allowing any entry back to the game. The final five hours were broadcast in a live stream by Giant Bomb, with Kotaku reporting events as they happened on the Giant Bomb stream, including a final player versus player event between the Galactic Empire and The Rebels, as well as an appearance from the Force Ghost of Obi-Wan Kenobi as depicted in The Empire Strikes Back and Return of the Jedi.

Reception and subscriptions

In the United States, Star Wars Galaxies: An Empire Divided sold 370,000 copies ($16.1 million) by August 2006, after its release in June 2003. It was the country's 43rd best-selling computer game between January 2000 and August 2006. Combined sales of all Star Wars Galaxies-related games released between January 2000 and August 2006 had reached 720,000 units in the United States by the latter date.

Reviews for the initial launch of the game in 2003 were mostly positive. The game was praised for its lush graphics (realistic character models, detailed architecture and lush environments), liberal use of the movie soundtracks, massive world size, character customization, creative creature ecology, complex skill system, player economy interdependencies and its sandbox approach. Reviewers criticized the overwhelming complexity of the game, combat imbalances of the professions, bugginess and lack of quest content.

Players who wished to play a Jedi character had to first unlock their Jedi slot by fulfilling an unknown list of criteria. The first player to unlock a 'Jedi slot' did so on November 7, 2003, four months after the release of the game. Players criticized SOE for the substantial time commitment to unlock a Jedi, penalties for in-game death of a Jedi character which was permanent after three deaths, and monotonous game play required to acquire the Jedi character. Developers responded by changing the penalty for death to skill loss in January 2004 and creating a quest system to unlock the character.

Media outlets criticized the changes of the "Combat Upgrade" while subscription cancellations rose. After the New Game Enhancements were implemented in November 2005, sparking huge demonstrations in-game from the majority of players, various media outlets criticized the reduced depth and complexity of the game, but John Smedley, president of Sony Online Entertainment, defended the decision claiming it necessary to revamp the game in order to reverse the deterioration they were seeing in the subscriber base. SOE offered refunds on the Trials of Obi-Wan expansion due to it being released two days before the New Game Enhancement was announced. The development team affirmed this was their desired direction for the game and that they would modify parameters to address player's concerns. Features such as expertise trees were later added to the game to add complexity and differentiation to characters. After the announcement that SOE had acquired the game Vanguard: Saga of Heroes, Smedley addressed that game's players about the perceived threat of major changes to the game: "We've learned a thing or two with our experiences with the NGE and don't plan on repeating mistakes from the past and not listening to the players."

Subscriber numbers were originally expected to exceed 1,000,000. In August 2005, SOE reported that they had sold 1,000,000 boxed copies of the game. In early 2006, unconfirmed reports showed that only 10,363 subscribers were playing on a particular Friday night, but Smedley denied that subscriptions had fallen this low.

In an online interview with Reddit in July 2012, John Smedley admitted to "stupid decisions" regarding Star Wars Galaxies combat upgrade and new gaming enhancement policies, and acknowledged player led emulator projects seeking to restore a free-to-play Galaxies circa April 2005, Publish 14.1, pre-Combat Upgrade, such as the SWGEmu project or the New Game Enhancements Upgrade, such as Project SWG.

Legacy
Expansions
Jump to Lightspeed

This first expansion, Jump to Lightspeed, was released on October 27, 2004. Two new races were added: Sullustan and Ithorian. The expansion added space combat. Characters choose one of three factions in the new Pilot sub-profession: Rebel, Imperial, or Freelance. The playable sectors include the space surrounding the 10 planets of the game as well as Ord Mantell, Kessel and "Deep Space." Combat is real-time and twitch-oriented like a first-person shooter and can be played with a joystick at the player's option. A new Artisan profession, Shipwright (now subsumed into the Trader profession as part of the Structures specialty), was also introduced. This profession created ships, shields, armor, weapons, etc. for players. They also have the ability to take looted components from space and reverse engineer them into better components. Players can construct their own ships with a base chassis, adding their own reactors, weapons, armor, shields, aesthetics and more, all of which visually change the starship's appearance. In many ways, this is the spiritual successor to the hit LucasArt's space combat flight simulation game Star Wars: X-Wing vs. TIE Fighter, as the theme, interface and objectives are quite similar.

The reviews for the first expansion, Jump to Lightspeed, praised the new space combat but criticized the ground game for its lack of sufficient improvement.

Rage of the Wookiees
The second expansion, Episode III Rage of the Wookiees, was announced on March 9, 2005, and released on May 5, 2005. It added the Wookiee planet of Kashyyyk and its corresponding space sector. Kashyyyk is different from the previous 10 planets: rather than being 16 square kilometers of openly navigable area, it is divided into a small central area with several instanced "dungeon" areas. A new space zone was also added. Other content added in this expansion included the ability to add cybernetic limbs to a player character and quests for two new creature mounts and three new starships. A substantial portion of the content for this expansion was adapted from the film Star Wars: Episode III – Revenge of the Sith which was released to theaters in the U.S. on May 19, two weeks after the expansion release.

Other features included new starfighters, resource mining in space, and cybernetic limbs for player characters. The cybernetic limbs, however, were not due to the loss of an arm in combat. The player had to obtain the arm and then surgically attach it. Customers who purchased the expansion also received a limited-edition Varactyl pet as a player mount. Rage of the Wookiees expansion also added a few quests, one allowed the player to obtain a pet Bolotaur after going through several tasks. The Bolotaur is similar to the Veractyl but larger and brown.

Gameplay mechanics for combat and armor/weapon systems received a major alteration on April 27, 2005, when SOE released the Combat Upgrade that replaced a system that allowed players with combat professions to stack defensive abilities from various skill sets, while also fixing an exploit that allowed players to have their character attack freshly spawning non-player characters (NPC) and creatures while away from their computers in order to gain combat skill experience.

The reviews for the second expansion, Rage of the Wookiees, lauded the new quest content for current subscribers but lamented the combat gameplay updates and the continued bugginess of the game.

Trials of Obi-Wan
The third expansion, Star Wars Galaxies: Trials of Obi-Wan''', was announced on August 19, 2005, and released on November 1, 2005. This expansion added the ground planet of Mustafar to the game. No new space sector was added with this expansion. Like the previous expansion, much of the content is related to Revenge of the Sith, which was released to DVD on the same day as the expansion was released. Additional content, including the presence of the droid HK-47, is based on the Knights of the Old Republic games.

One week after this release the entire character development process was changed in the New Game Enhancements (NGE). Major changes included the reduction and simplification of professions, simplification of gameplay mechanics, and Jedi becoming a starting profession. This led to a number of players demanding their money back for the expansion. After a week or two of protests Sony offered refunds to anyone who asked for it. Many player towns became ghost towns due to the reaction of long term players who decided to depart en masse.

Star Wars Galaxies compilations
On top of the expansions, SOE released several compilations of their games:Star Wars Galaxies - The Total ExperienceThis pack included the original Star Wars Galaxies (An Empire Divided), Jump to Lightspeed and the Rage of the Wookiees expansion packs. Customers who bought this pack also received a BARC speeder as a gift.Star Wars Galaxies - Starter KitThe kit was the first version of the New Game Enhancement (NGE). It contained An Empire Divided and Jump to Lightspeed. Customers who bought this pack also received an X-wing or TIE fighter instant transport vehicle as a gift.Star Wars Galaxies - The Complete Online AdventuresThis included the original game with the first three expansion packs, a DVD of never-before released bonus features, a slide show of more than 800 pieces of Star Wars Galaxies concept art and screenshots, all set to more than an hour of orchestral in-game music, excerpts from the popular From Pencil to Pixel book that chronicles the art of Star Wars Galaxies and interviews with the producers, and all the cinematic trailers for the game. It also included an exclusive in-game item for use while playing – a personal AT-RT vehicle as seen in Revenge of the Sith. This version was the first to be released in Australia, instead of An Empire Divided.Star Wars Galaxies - The Complete Online Adventures Premium Digital DownloadThis included An Empire Divided, Jump to Lightspeed, Rage of the Wookiees, Trials of Obi-Wan, and players who purchase it also receive a bonus instant travel vehicle, the Queen Amidala Transport Ship and an AT-RT walker. No disc media is provided as it is an Internet download, which later came with a Queen Amidala Transport Ship (one per character), a General Grievous Wheel Bike, a Double seated Bike for the player and a friend (one per character), a Lava Flea mount (one per account), an Underground Mustafar Bunker player house (one per account), an AT-RT walker mount (one per account), a Varactyl mount (one per account).

NovelizationStar Wars Galaxies: The Ruins of Dantooine is a novel based in part on places and events in the game. It was authored by Voronica Whitney-Robinson and Haden Blackman, the LucasArts producer of the game. It was released in December 2003.

Trading Card Game
On August 27, 2008, following the success of SOE's Legends of Norrath, LucasArts and SOE released Champions of the Force, an online trading card game based on Star Wars Galaxies''. In the game, players could collect, battle, and trade with each other as well as buy new cards with money and get new in-game items from the cards to use; such as podracers and house paintings. Over one hundred cards were created for players to find and play against others with new artwork featured on each card.

Emulation 
In 2004, the SWGEmu project was founded with the intention of re-creating the Pre-Combat Upgrade version of Star Wars Galaxies from scratch through emulation by reverse engineering the official game client and writing a server that communicates with it in the same way the original SOE servers did. The goal of SWGEmu is to emulate the game to its entirety as it was on the live servers through patch 14.1. In 2020, the SWGEmu project announced it was near completion (colloquially referred to as version 1.0) and that many of the existing developers who had invested significant time over the past ten or more years would be taking a back seat role moving forward and also announced that the Jump to Lightspeed expansion may no longer be included in version 1.0 due to the complexities of implementing the system. SWGEmu is an open source project distributed under the Affero General Public License. The server, known as Core3, has been open source since before 2010, allowing for volunteers to easily contribute to its development. In 2019, SWGEmu also open sourced its engine, known as Engine3. Because SWGEmu is open source, any members are able to easily launch their own server for their own community. There are several community-ran servers which develop content beyond the 14.1 publish goal of SWGEmu, such as An Empire in Flames, Sunrunner II, SWG Awakening Tarkin's Revenge and Sentinel's Republic.

In 2011, after Sony Online Entertainment announced the intention of shutting down Star Wars Galaxies, Project SWG was founded under the same sentiment as SWGEmu to emulate the New Game Enhancements version of Star Wars Galaxies. Project SWG has not been as objectively successful as SWGEmu and has undergone multiple refactors of their code since conception. Their current server, Holocore, is still under development by a small team and is several years away from completion. Other interested developers are also using Project SWG's framework to develop a Combat Upgrade version of the game. Project SWG's once thriving community has dwindled due to the leak of the official source code and launch of game servers running the leaked code.

Both SWGEmu and Project SWG are regarded as the primary emulation projects for Star Wars Galaxies with other communities utilizing their source code to run their own server, sometimes contributing specific code to create their own content or by using shared content from resources such as ModTheGalaxy, a game modification distribution forum. All emulation projects are free-to-play and donation-supported to respect the sensitivities around the legality of emulation to begin with. Some player-made tools created while Star Wars Galaxies was live, such as SWGCraft and GalaxyHarvester, are still up and running with connections to most hosted servers today.

Source Code Leak 
In 2013, a former Sony Online Entertainment employee leaked a copy of the 2010 production release source code for the Star Wars Galaxies client, server, 3rd party libraries and development tools to a few former players involved with the "New Game Enhancements" Star Wars Galaxies emulator Project SWG. The code was later leaked beyond its intended recipients and made available online.

References

External links
 
 
 
 

 
2003 video games
Massively multiplayer online role-playing games
Inactive massively multiplayer online games
Space massively multiplayer online role-playing games
Science fiction massively multiplayer online role-playing games
Video games developed in the United States
Video games with expansion packs
Virtual economies
Windows games
Windows-only games
LucasArts games
Products and services discontinued in 2011